Mark R. Noland is an American politician and a Republican member of the Montana House of Representatives, where he represents District 10, including Bigfork, Montana.

Political career 

Noland was first elected to represent District 10 in the Montana House of Representatives in 2014, and is running for his third re-election in 2020.

Noland sits on the following committees:
 Business and Labor (chair)
 Natural Resources
 Legislative Administration

Electoral record

See also 
 Montana House of Representatives, District 10

References

Living people
People from Bigfork, Montana
Republican Party members of the Montana House of Representatives
21st-century American politicians
1959 births